Pat Thomas (born 27 July 1960) is a jazz pianist from Oxford, England.

Biography
Thomas received a Paul Hamlyn Foundation Award for Artists in 2014. Several of his recordings were released in 2019: "from the ruminative post-bop piano trio heard on BleySchool, the free improv of the collective trio Shifa, an exploratory trio with reedist John Butcher and drummer Ståle Liavik Solberg on Fictional Souvenirs and a stunning live solo piano set of Duke Ellington music available digitally from London's Cafe Oto". Thomas is part of the band Ahmed, a quartet with Antonin Gerbal, Joel Grip and Seymour Wright inspired by the music of Ahmed Abdul-Malik; their New Jazz Imagination was released by Umlaut in 2017 and was followed by Super Majnoon (East Meets West).

References

External links

http://www.blacktopmusic.org/ Black Top (project with Orphy Robinson) official site

http://www.efi.group.shef.ac.uk/mthomas.html
http://ukvibe.org/interviews/2014-interviews/pat-thomas-2014/

https://discus-music.co.uk/catalogue-mobile/dis103-detail Pat Thomas plays Anthony Braxton

Living people
1960 births
English jazz pianists
English jazz composers
English experimental musicians
Avant-garde jazz pianists
Musicians from London
20th-century English musicians
21st-century English musicians
Incus Records artists
FMR Records artists
Emanem Records artists